Fairbanks Township may refer to:

 Fairbanks Township, Sullivan County, Indiana
 Fairbanks Township, Michigan
 Fairbanks Township, St. Louis County, Minnesota
 Fairbanks Township, Renville County, North Dakota, in Renville County, North Dakota

Township name disambiguation pages